Pradhan Mantri Kisan Samman Nidhi (PMKSN, translation: Prime Minister's Farmer's Tribute Fund) is an initiative by the government of India that give farmers up to  per year as minimum income support. The initiative was announced by Piyush Goyal during the 2019 Interim Union Budget of India on 1 February 2019.

History
The scheme was first conceived and implemented by government of Telangana as the Rythu Bandhu scheme, where a certain amount is given directly to eligible farmers. The scheme has received accolades from various organisations for its successful implementation, including World Bank. Many economist suggest that this type of investment support is better than farm loan waivers. With the positive outcome of this scheme, Government of India wanted to implement it as nationwide project and it was announced by Piyush Goyal during the 2019 Interim Union Budget of India on 1 February 2019.

For 2018–2019, ₹20,000 crore was allocated under this scheme. On 24 February 2019, Narendra Modi launched the scheme in Gorakhpur, Uttar Pradesh, by transferring the first instalment of ₹2,000 each to over one crore farmers.

Ministry of Agriculture and Farmers Welfare has awarded the top-performing states, and districts under PM Kisan Samman Nidhi Yojana. It is based on the criteria such as correction of data, addressing farmer grievances, and timely physical verification exercise.

Comparison with similar schemes

See also
 Agriculture in India
 Agricultural insurance in India
 Irrigation in India
 Rashtriya Krishi Vikas Yojana

References

2019 in India
2019 introductions
Agricultural finance in India
Government schemes in India
Ministry of Agriculture & Farmers' Welfare
Modi administration initiatives
Social security in India